Kings Norton Girls' School is an all-girls academy school for pupils aged 11–19. Established in 1910, it is located in Selly Oak Road in Kings Norton within the formal district of 
Northfield, a suburb of the city of Birmingham, England.

Curriculum
The school operates both a lower school and 6th form provision. The 6th form provison went co-ed in 2014 to allow boys to attend Kings Norton Girls' School at A level.

Pupils follow a broad curriculum that includes National Curriculum core subjects, GCSE and A-Level. The school offers courses in:

 Art & Design - Textiles
 B TEC Travel and Tourism
 Biology
 Business Studies
 Chemistry
 Computer Science,
 D&T Product Design
 Drama & Theatre Studies
 English Language-Literature
 English Literature
 French
 Further Mathematics
 Geography
 German
 Government and Politics
 History
 Mathematics
 Media Studies
 Music
 Music Technology
 Photography
 Physical Education
 Physics
 Psychology
 Religious Studies
 Sociology
 Spanish
 TEC National Certificate in Sport

The school is involved in a range of partnerships with other schools and colleges locally and internationally, and was designated a Specialist Language College in 2001. It became a Leading Edge School in 2003, and gained a second specialism in Sport in 2006.

Notable alumnae

 Felicity Jones, actress (for her GCSEs)
 Alison Kervin, sports editor of the Mail on Sunday, and the first woman in the UK to become sports editor of a major national newspaper.

Kings Norton School for Girls
 Susan Jameson, actress, married to James Bolam (not to be confused with Louise Jameson)
 Ann Haydon-Jones CBE, tennis player who won seven Grand Slam championships, including Wimbledon in 1969, and BBC tennis commentator
 Brigadier Eileen Nolan CB, Director from 1973 to 1977 of the Women’s Royal Army Corps
 Sheila Whitaker, Director from 1987 to 1996 of the BFI London Film Festival

References

Academies in Birmingham, West Midlands
Girls' schools in the West Midlands (county)
Secondary schools in Birmingham, West Midlands